Leonardo Figueroa (born April 17, 1990) is a Chilean footballer who currently plays for Deportes Colchagua as a goalkeeper.

Career

Youth career

Figueroa started his career at Primera División de Chile club Universidad de Concepción. He progressed from the under categories club all the way to the senior team.

O'Higgins
On 10 June 2016, Figueroa firm for 1 year on loan from Universidad de Concepción with O'Higgins.

Honours

Club
Universidad de Concepción
Copa Chile: 2014–15

References

External links
 

1990 births
Living people
Chilean footballers
Association football goalkeepers
O'Higgins F.C. footballers
Universidad de Concepción footballers
Cobresal footballers
Everton de Viña del Mar footballers
San Luis de Quillota footballers
People from Talca